Kim Kaufman (born August 16, 1991) is an American professional golfer and LPGA Tour player. She was runner-up at the 2015 Blue Bay LPGA.

Early life, amateur and college career
Kaufman was born in Huron, South Dakota, and grew up in Clark, South Dakota, where she was a six-time South Dakota Golf Association Junior Champion, with a career-low round of 66. She was South Dakota state champion four times at Clark High School, and was an all-state selection all four years. She qualified three times for the U.S. Girls' Junior and advanced to the quarterfinals in 2009. She also played in the U.S. Women's Amateur three times and in two U.S. Women's Amateur Public Links championships.

Kaufman attended Texas Tech University between 2009 and 2013. In the fall of 2012, she ranked as the No. 1 golfer in the country according to Golfweek, and was named the Golfweek Player of the Fall.

Professional career
Kaufman turned professional and joined the Symetra Tour in 2013. She made 10 cuts in 10 starts and won the Island Resort Championship after a playoff with Mitsuki Katahira of Japan.
 
She finished tied for 23rd at the LPGA Final Qualifying Tournament to earn membership for the 2014 LPGA Tour. In her rookie season, she was tied for 4th at the North Texas LPGA Shootout and tied for 5th at the Canadian Pacific Women's Open, and finished 58th on the money list. In 2015, she was runner-up at the Blue Bay LPGA and finished 45th on the money list. 

In 2016, Kaufman crossed the $1 million mark in career earnings after her T7 finish at the Sime Darby LPGA Malaysia and rose to a high of 67th in the Women's World Golf Rankings.

After finishing 53rd on the money list in 2016 and 58th in 2017, her career took a hit when she was diagnosed with mononucleosis in Japan and fell down a flight of stairs and injured her wrist while recovering. She finished 123rd in 2018 and to keep her card for the 2019 season had to attend the inaugural LPGA Q-Series, where she tied for 11th.

In 2020, Kaufman found herself back on the Symetra Tour, where she won the Four Winds Invitational and finished third on the money list.

Personal life
Kaufman is married to Sweden-born pro golfer Johan Wolkesson, who has caddied for her, including at the 2020 U.S. Women's Open.

Amateur wins
2012 Landfall Tradition

Source:

Professional wins (3)

Symetra Tour wins (3)

Symetra Tour playoff record (1–0)

Results in LPGA majors
Results not in chronological order.

CUT = missed the half-way cut
NT = no tournament
T = tied

References

External links

American female golfers
LPGA Tour golfers
Texas Tech Red Raiders women's golfers
People from Huron, South Dakota
People from Clark, South Dakota
Sportspeople from Fort Worth, Texas
1991 births
Living people